Desulfotomaculum thermoacetoxidans is an obligately anaerobic, thermophilic, spore-forming sulfate-reducing bacterium with type strain CAMZ.

References

Further reading

External links
LPSN

Type strain of Desulfotomaculum thermoacetoxidans at BacDive -  the Bacterial Diversity Metadatabase

Peptococcaceae